Myanmar, also known as Burma, has many organisations and societies set up by the government. Although they are loosely termed NGOs, they are partly under the supervision and receive funding from the government. The Myanmar Red Cross, for example, does carry out red cross related duties, but is also considered as a potential reserve force in times of conflict, while the War Veterans' Organisation is a quasi-political society.

The following is a list of social and non-governmental organisations in Myanmar:

References

 List of International Ngos

Non-governmental